Richard E. Hallgren is a former executive director of the American Meteorological Society (AMS) and a scientist with over 50 years of experience. He had several senior positions with the National Oceanic and Atmospheric Administration (NOAA) including the director of the National Weather Service, director of World Weather Systems and federal coordinator for Meteorological Services and Supporting Research. He directed the National Weather Service from 1979-1988 and was the executive director of the American Meteorological Society as of 1988. His many national and international honors and awards include: the Arthur S. Fleming Award, the Department of Commerce Gold Medal, the Charles F. Brooks Award and the International Meteorological Organization Prize of the World Meteorological Organization.

He received his PhD and BS in meteorology from the Pennsylvania State University. He wrote the book called A Safer Future: Reducing The Impacts Of Natural Disasters.

References

Date of birth missing (living people)
Living people
Penn State College of Earth and Mineral Sciences alumni
American meteorologists
National Weather Service
Year of birth missing (living people)